Harrison Ford (March 16, 1884 – December 2, 1957) was an American silent film actor. He was a leading Broadway theater performer and a star of the silent film era.

Career

Born in Kansas City, Missouri, the son of Anna and Walter, Ford began his acting career on the stage. He made his Broadway debut in 1904 in Richard Harding Davis's Ranson's Folly. He went on to appear in productions of William C. deMille's Strongheart; Glorious Betsy by Rida Johnson Young (the production lasted only 24 performances but the play was later adapted for an Oscar-nominated film of the same name); Bayard Veiller's The Fight (which quickly closed); Edgar Wallace's The Switchboard; Edward Locke's The Bubble; and Edgar Selwyn's Rolling Stones.

Ford turned to film beginning in 1915 and moved to Hollywood. He became a leading man opposite stars such as Constance Talmadge, Norma Talmadge, Marie Prevost, Marion Davies, Marguerite De La Motte and Clara Bow. Ford's film career ended with the advent of talkies. His final film, and only talkie, Love in High Gear, was released in 1932. He returned to acting in the theatre, and also directed productions at the Little Theater of the Verdugos in Glendale, California. During World War II, he toured with the United Service Organizations (USO).

Personal life
Ford married New York stage actress, Beatrice Prentice (1884–1977), in Rochester, New York on March 29, 1909.

On September 13, 1951, while out walking, he was struck by a car driven by a female teenager. He never recovered from the severe injuries received and spent the rest of his life at the Motion Picture & Television Country House and Hospital in Woodland Hills, California, and died there on December 2, 1957, at the age of 73. He was buried in the Forest Lawn Memorial Park Cemetery in Glendale.

For his contribution to the motion picture industry, Harrison Ford has a star on the Hollywood Walk of Fame in front of the Musso & Frank Grill at 6665 Hollywood Blvd.

Ford has no known relation to the later film actor of the same name.

Filmography

References

Bibliography

External links

 
 
 
 
 Ford biography and photos at goldensilents.com
 Harrison Ford at Virtual History
 1920 passport photo
 Studio portraits: photo #1, photo #2
 Film stills: with Wallace Reid The Lottery Man (1919) and with Clara Bow in Three Weekends (1928)
 https://www.linkedin.com/pulse/harrison-ford-dangers-assumption-martin-wright

1884 births
1957 deaths
Male actors from Kansas City, Missouri
American male film actors
American male stage actors
American male silent film actors
Burials at Forest Lawn Memorial Park (Glendale)
20th-century American male actors
Road incident deaths in California